Sister San Sulpicio (Spanish:La hermana San Sulpicio) is an 1889 novel by the Spanish writer Armando Palacio Valdés.

Film adaptations
It has been turned into films on four separate occasions:
 Sister San Sulpicio (1927 film), a silent film directed by Florián Rey 
 Sister San Sulpicio (1934 film), a sound film directed by Florián Rey 
 Sister San Sulpicio (1952 film), a sound film directed by Luis Lucia 
 The Rebellious Novice, a 1971 musical film adaptation

References

Bibliography
 Goble, Alan. The Complete Index to Literary Sources in Film. Walter de Gruyter, 1 Jan 1999.

Novels by Armando Palacio Valdés
1889 novels
19th-century Spanish novels
Spanish novels adapted into films